Howard Township is the name of three townships in the U.S. state of Indiana:

 Howard Township, Howard County, Indiana
 Howard Township, Parke County, Indiana
 Howard Township, Washington County, Indiana

See also
 Howard Township (disambiguation)

Indiana township disambiguation pages